Lisa Olivia Munn (born July 3, 1980) is an American actress and former television host. After an internship at a news station in Tulsa, she moved to Los Angeles where she began her professional career as a television host for the gaming network G4, primarily on the series Attack of the Show! from 2006 until 2010. She appeared as a correspondent on The Daily Show with Jon Stewart from 2010 to 2011. She is known for her three-season-long portrayal of Sloan Sabbith in Aaron Sorkin's HBO political drama series The Newsroom (2012–2014).

Munn's other acting roles include a recurring role on the television series Beyond the Break (2006—2009) and supporting roles in comedy films Big Stan (2007) and Date Night (2010), superhero film Iron Man 2 (2010), and Steven Soderbergh's comedy-drama Magic Mike (2012). She starred in the supernatural horror film Deliver Us from Evil (2014), the comedy Mortdecai (2015), and X-Men: Apocalypse (2016) as Psylocke. In 2017, she provided the voice of Koko in The Lego Ninjago Movie, and had appeared in the History Channel series Six (2017). In 2018, she had a leading role in the science fiction film The Predator, the fourth film in the Predator franchise.

Early life
Munn was born on July 3, 1980, in Oklahoma City to Kimberly Schmid and Winston Munn. Her father is of German, Irish, and English ancestry. Her mother, who is Vietnamese with Chinese ancestry, arrived as a refugee in the United States in 1975 following the Vietnam War and settled in Oklahoma, where she met Munn's father. Munn has a younger brother, John, a physicist; an older brother, James, a custom motorcycle shop owner; and two older sisters, Annie and Sara, the latter of whom is a lawyer.

When Munn was two years old, her parents divorced and her mother married a member of the United States Air Force. The family relocated to Utah, where they resided until 1986. Munn's stepfather was then transferred to Yokota Air Base near Tachikawa in Tokyo, Japan, where she spent her formative years. She has said that her stepfather was "verbally abusive" and demeaning. "When [he] would be screaming his head off in the living room, I would hustle everybody into my room and launch into imitations of teachers or do scenes from movies," she recalled. "And that would take their minds off of the hell that was happening down the hall."

When Munn was 16, her mother divorced her stepfather and moved with the children back to Oklahoma City. Munn attended Putnam City North High School for her junior and senior years, then attended the University of Oklahoma, where she earned a B.A. in journalism with a minor in Japanese and dramatic arts.

Career

2004–2009: Career beginnings and acting

Munn worked as an intern at the NBC affiliate in Tulsa before relocating to Los Angeles. In 2004, she interned at Fox Sports Networks and worked as a sideline reporter for college football and women's basketball. She said that she disliked the experience: "I was trying to be something I wasn't, and that made me really uncomfortable on live TV."
She soon moved to Los Angeles, where she was cast in a small role in the direct-to-video horror film Scarecrow Gone Wild. She appeared in rock band Zebrahead's music video for their song "Hello Tomorrow" as the love interest of lead singer Justin Mauriello.
She also appeared in National Lampoon's Strip Poker, filmed at Hedonism II, a naturist resort in Negril, Jamaica, with Kato Kaelin. The films aired on DirecTV and In Demand pay-per-view.

In late 2005, Munn began her role as teen surfer Mily Acuna over two seasons of the television drama Beyond the Break, which aired during Noggin's teen block, The N. She enjoys surfing and continues to practice the sport. She originally auditioned for the role of Kai Kealoha, but the producers wanted a "local girl". She also appeared in the film The Road to Canyon Lake.

In 2006, Munn won a contest put out to the public to find a replacement for departing co-host Kevin Rose on the popular G4 network program Attack of the Show! She then began co-hosting with Kevin Pereira on April 10. She replaced temporary co-host Sarah Lane. The network, devoted to the world of video games and the video games lifestyle, was at first hesitant to hire Munn. Although she admits video games were her "weak point", she was confident in her technical knowledge. On the show, she was featured with journalist Anna David in a segment called "In Your Pants", which deals with sex and relationship questions from viewers. While working on Attack of the Show!, she hosted Formula D, a now defunct program about American drift racing, and an online podcast called Around the Net, formerly known as The Daily Nut, for G4. She left Attack of the Show! in December 2010 and was replaced by Candace Bailey. She appeared in the Rob Schneider film Big Stan (2007), where she played Schneider's character's receptionist Maria. She had a significant role in the horror film Insanitarium, where she played a nurse at an asylum.

2010–2014: The Newsroom and breakthrough

She had roles in the films Date Night (2010) and Iron Man 2 (2010). Robert Downey, Jr. praised Munn for her improvisation skills and led the crew in a round of applause.
Munn hosted Microsoft's Bing-a-thon, an advertisement on Hulu for the Microsoft search-engine Bing, on June 8, 2009, alongside Jason Sudeikis. Munn appeared in ABC Family's Greek, portraying Cappie's love interest, Lana. In May 2010, NBC announced that Munn would star on the television series Perfect Couples. The half-hour romantic comedy premiered on January 20, 2011. The series was canceled before it completed its first season run.

On June 3, 2010, Munn debuted in her new role as a correspondent on Comedy Central's The Daily Show. She went on to appear in 16 more episodes as a correspondent, with TV Guide naming her signature segment "Tiger Mothering," in which she mocked the high expectations of Chinese mothers, in part by interviewing her own mother. Her last episode as a correspondent aired September 2, 2011. She returned for a brief segment in host Jon Stewart's final show on August 6, 2015.

In 2010, Munn guest-starred on NBC's comedy-drama Chuck as a CIA agent. In 2011, Munn appeared in the comedy film I Don't Know How She Does It (2011) as Momo. In 2012, Munn had a leading role in The Babymakers, a minor role in Freeloaders, and appeared in Magic Mike, directed by Steven Soderbergh. She also appeared as Angie, Nick's stripper girlfriend, in three episodes in season two of FOX's sitcom New Girl.

Munn gained prominence in a lead role in Aaron Sorkin's drama series The Newsroom on HBO. In the series, she played Sloan Sabbith, an economist who worked on the show's fictional news network, ACN, alongside lead anchor Will McAvoy (Jeff Daniels). The series ran for three seasons from 2012 to 2015. Since then, Munn and her costar Thomas Sadoski have discussed with Sorkin their desire for the show to return.

Munn played a correspondent in "True Colors," the May 12, 2014 episode of the Showtime documentary series Years of Living Dangerously in which she interviewed Washington State Governor Jay Inslee about his efforts to reduce CO2 emissions in his home state. As of June 2014, Munn has been hired as the main promoter of Proactiv acne cleanser products starring in several commercials and one infomercial for the product. The commercials show Munn experiencing acne herself.

2015–present
Beginning in January 2015, Munn voiced the character Phoebe Callisto on the Disney Junior animated series Miles from Tomorrowland. In 2016, Munn was cast as Elizabeth Braddock / Psylocke (one of Apocalypse's Four Horsemen) in X-Men: Apocalypse. Though the film received mixed reviews, it was a financial success, grossing over $500 million worldwide. The same year, Munn had a leading role portraying a technical supervisor in the comedy film Office Christmas Party.

She also had a starring role in the television series Six as a CIA operative and appeared on Season 13 of America's Got Talent as a guest judge in the season's second Judge Cuts episode. Munn also starred as a biologist in the 2018 science fiction horror film The Predator, the fourth installment in the Predator franchise. Following the film's release, it was revealed that Munn's co-star, Steven Wilder Striegel, with whom she shared a scene, was a registered sex offender who had preyed on a 14-year-old girl. Upon learning of this, Munn informed her fellow cast members, and requested that the scene (Striegel's sole appearance in the film) be cut from the film, which 20th Century Fox agreed to.

Munn subsequently had a lead role in the Netflix-released romantic comedy film Love Wedding Repeat (2020), a remake of the French feature Plan de Table.

In print

Munn has appeared in advertising campaigns for Nike, Pepsi and Neutrogena. She appeared on the Fall 2006 cover of Foam magazine in September, in Men's Edge magazine in August, and was featured in a pictorial in Complex in November 2006, where she later became a columnist. In February 2007, she appeared as "Babe of the Month" in a non-nude pictorial in Playboy magazine. She discusses this shoot in her book Suck it, Wonder Woman: The Misadventures of a Hollywood Geek.

Munn also appeared in the July/August 2007 issue of Men's Health. In September 2007, she was featured in the Italian Vanity Fair for their "Hot Young Hollywood" Issue. Munn appeared in the Winter/Spring 2009 issue of Men's Health Living. She was featured as the cover girl for the July/August 2009 issue of Playboy, and later on the cover of the January 2010 and February 2011 issues of Maxim. Munn appears on the cover of the January 2012 issue of FHM magazine. She was voted #2 by readers on Maxims list of their Hot 100 Women of 2012.

Munn's book Suck It, Wonder Woman was released on July 6, 2010. In a review for Time Out New York, Olivia Giovetti said that the book offers glimpses into Munn's life, but does not go into depth.

Activism and charity work
In 2011, Munn teamed up with Dosomething.org's Green Your School Challenge. She was a spokesperson for the campaign by filming a PSA regarding the challenge, and sat on the panel of judges that evaluated the entries.

Munn helped PETA with a campaign that ultimately freed an ill elephant from a touring circus. Her blog for The Huffington Post was credited with encouraging fans to contact the USDA on the elephant's behalf. Munn posed for PETA's "I'd Rather Go Naked Than Wear Fur" campaign in April 2010, and again in January 2012. In February 2013, Munn fronted a PETA release of new footage showing cruelty to animals in Chinese fur farms. She appears in the 2021 short film Save Ralph, a film by Humane Society International about animal testing.

Munn has used her platform to speak out against anti-Asian sentiments, harassment, and assaults following the COVID-19 pandemic. Munn was part of a roundtable discussion alongside Stop AAPI Hate co-founder Russell Jeung, RISE founder and CEO Amanda Nguyen with CBS News entitled "Asian Americans Battling Bias: Continuing Crisis."

Personal life
In regard to her faith and work in Deliver Us from Evil, Munn has said that "I didn't believe in the supernatural before this movie." However, after viewing footage from the New York City Police Department of allegedly real-life exorcisms, she stated "I'm a full believer [now]."

She is a black belt in taekwondo.

In November 2017, Munn accused film director Brett Ratner of repeatedly sexually harassing her, as well as an instance of sexual assault. She has supported the Me Too and Time's Up movements with both personal efforts and public statements.

Munn was in a relationship with NFL quarterback Aaron Rodgers from 2014 to 2017. She began dating comedian John Mulaney in 2021, and they announced that Munn was pregnant in September 2021. Their son was born on November 24, 2021. Their son's middle name is Hiệp, which honors Munn's Vietnamese heritage.

Filmography

Film

Television

Music videos

Bibliography

References

Further reading

External links

 
 

1980 births
21st-century American actresses
21st-century American memoirists
21st-century American women writers
Actresses from Los Angeles
Actresses from Oklahoma City
Actresses from Tokyo
Actresses from Utah
American actresses of Chinese descent
American expatriates in Japan
American female taekwondo practitioners
American film actresses
American people of English descent
American people of German descent
American people of Irish descent
American people of Vietnamese descent
American television actresses
American television talk show hosts
American voice actresses
American women memoirists
American women television presenters
American writers of Chinese descent
American writers of Vietnamese descent
Cosplayers
Living people
Sasuke (TV series) contestants
Television personalities from Los Angeles
Television personalities from Oklahoma City
Television personalities from Utah
University of Oklahoma alumni
Writers from Oklahoma City
Writers from Los Angeles
Writers from Tokyo
Writers from Utah